The 2014 Miami RedHawks football team represented Miami University in the 2014 NCAA Division I FBS football season. They were led by first-year head coach Chuck Martin and played their home games at Yager Stadium and competed as a member of the East Division of the Mid-American Conference. They finished the season 2–10, 2–6 in MAC play to finish in sixth place in the East Division.

Schedule

References

Miami
Miami RedHawks football seasons
Miami RedHawks football